Mendel Markovich Khatayevich (3 October 1893 – 30 October 1937) was a Soviet politician.  17 March 1937 was 2nd Secretary of the Communist Party (Bolsheviks) of Ukraine. He was one of the main organizers of collectivization in the Ukrainian Soviet Socialist Republic, which caused the death by starvation of millions of people.

Born in Gomel (in present-day Belarus) in 1893, the son of a Jewish merchant. Khatayevich joined the Bolshevik faction Russian Social Democratic Labour Party in 1913. Arrested in 1914, he was exiled to Angara. Released from exile by the February Revolution, he returned to Gomel, but in 1918, was transferred to Samara, where he was taken prisoner by anti-Bolshevik troops, and tortured so badly that his right hand was paralysed, but he survived and was rescued when the city was recaptured by the Red Army. From November 1918, he held a succession of party post in Gomel, Odessa, Moscow, and the Tatar Republic. In 1930, he was elected a member of the Central Committee of the Communist Party of the Soviet Union.

Khatayevich was  running the communist party in the Tatar republic at the beginning of the drive to force the peasants onto collective farms, and in March 1930, when Joseph Stalin had an article published in Pravda, entitled Dizzy with Success, which blamed local officials for the excesses committed during the early months of the new policy, which he had initiated. In April, Khatayevich wrote an unusually outspoken response, in which he suggested that a large share of the blame lay at the centre. He claimed: "Instructions should have been given to the central press so that, in criticising the deviations and excesses which took place, they should attack and mock not only local officials. Many directives on collectivising all livestock, including the smallest types, came from the agricultural commissariat."

Role in the Holodomor 
In October 1932, Khatayevich was transferred to Ukraine, as a member of the Political Bureau of the Communist Party (Bolsheviks) of Ukraine, and secretary of Ukraine CP Central Committee. He was a member of the Ukrainian Politburo until his arrest, seven years later. When the Court of Appeal for Kyiv City investigated the famine that swept through Ukraine in the 1930s, in a judgement delivered on 13 January 2010  they found Khatayevich and other long-dead Soviet leaders Joseph Stalin, Vyacheslav Molotov, Lazar Kaganovich, Pavel Postyshev, Stanislav Kosior and Vlas Chubar guilty of "organizing genocide of the Ukrainian ethnic group".

It is well documented that Khatayevich knew from his first days in Ukraine that the collectivisation campaign had caused a catastrophic fall in food production, and was threatening the health of peasants who had been forced to join collective farms. Nine days after his arrival, he wrote to Stalin to warn that Ukraine was not going to meet its target for delivering grain, and might produce only half of what was expected, citing as one of the main reasons "the decreased well-being of collective farmers (and) lack of proper production activity on collective farms." But on 23 October 1932, he sent a directive to every regional, city and district committee of the Ukraine communist party ordering them to take firm measures to confiscate grain from peasants. In November, he and Chubar co-signed a decree on "crushing kulak groups", which led to the army being deployed to break the resistance of the peasants.

Early in 1933, Khatayevich was moved to Dnipropetrovsk, as First Secretary of the regional communist party. In March 1933, he wrote to Stalin, again, warning "I am literally inundated with daily reports and materials about cases of starvation, swelling and disease from hunger. In recent days, there have been more and more reports of corpse-eating and cannibalism." This included corpses lying on the streets of several town. He went on to claim that many of these reports of death and illness were "exaggerated", but pleaded all the same for emergency medical care. In June, he sent a telegram begging for food to be sent the region.

There was no hint of these problems in the speech Khatayevich delivered to the 17th Party Congress in 1934, when he praised the "fighting spirit" of Ukraine's collective farmers, and the way that "Comrade Stalin led our party, led us, our entire army of fighters for socialism, with the greatest firmness, calmness, composure, with a clear perspective."

Arrest and death 
Khatayevich was one of its beneficiaries of the Great Purge in its early stage, when he was promoted to the post of Second Secretary of the Communist Party of the Ukrainian SSR, in March 1937, when Postyshev was sacked, but on 7 September 1937 he was arrested, and on 27 October 1937 sentenced to death on charges of participating in a counterrevolutionary terrorist organization and executed.

In 1956 Khatayevich was rehabilitated and restored in the party.

References

1893 births
1937 deaths
People from Gomel
People from Gomelsky Uyezd
Belarusian Jews
Soviet Jews
Jews executed by the Soviet Union
Jewish socialists
Old Bolsheviks
Communist Party of Ukraine (Soviet Union) politicians
Politicians of the Ukrainian Soviet Socialist Republic
Governors of Dnipropetrovsk Oblast
Great Purge victims from Belarus
Members of the Communist Party of the Soviet Union executed by the Soviet Union
Soviet rehabilitations
Soviet mass murderers
Genocide perpetrators
Executed mass murderers